Kjelvik is an abandoned fishing village in Nordkapp Municipality in Troms og Finnmark county, Norway. It sits near the mouth of the Porsangerfjorden. The village no longer has any permanent residents, but the homes are still used as vacation homes in the summer.

Kjelvik was the original name of Nordkapp municipality since Kjelvik was one of the largest settlements in the municipality, larger even than Honningsvåg.  However, during World War II, the village was destroyed by German forces in 1944, and it never recovered.  As a consequence of this, in 1950 the name of the municipality was changed to Nordkapp to recognize the importance of the nearby North Cape.

Name
The village is first mentioned in 1518 ("Kedelwigh"), but it is probably from older times (Old Norse: Ketilvík). The first element is ketill which means "kettle" and the last element is vík which means "inlet". The meaning of the name is then: "the inlet formed like a kettle".

References

External links
Kjelvik - det gamle kommunesentret 

Nordkapp
Villages in Finnmark
Former populated places in Finnmark